Adarnase III may refer to:

 Adarnase III of Iberia (ruled c. 748 to 760)
 Adarnase III of Tao (died 896)